Kohat Tehsil railway station
() is located in Pakistan. Kohat Express is operated from this Station on daily basis, Named as Kohat Express. This train Departs Kohat Daily at 7am in summer from 15th april to 15th october,7:30am in winter from 15th oct to 15th april and returns from Rawalpindi at 3:30 pm daily.

See also
 List of railway stations in Pakistan
 Pakistan Railways

References

External links

Railway stations in Kohat District
Railway stations on Khushalgarh–Kohat–Thal Railway